Dörfli (Swiss German for ″little village″) may refer to:

 Dörfli (Oberried am Brienzersee), a settlement in the municipality of Oberried am Brienzersee, in the Swiss canton of Bern
 Dörfli (Silenen), a hamlet in the municipality of Silenen in the Swiss canton of Uri
 Dörfli (Wolfenschiessen), a settlement in the municipality of Wolfenschiessen in the Swiss canton of Nidwalden
 Sertig Dörfli, a settlement in the municipality of Davos, in the Swiss canton of Graubünden
See also

 Dörfli railway station